La Democracia means "the democracy" in Spanish. The name may refer to:

 La Democracia (newspaper), a Puerto Rican newspaper

Belize
La Democracia, Belize, village in the Belize District

Guatemala
La Democracia, Escuintla, municipality in the Escuintla department
La Democracia, Huehuetenango, municipality in the Huehuetenango department

Venezuela
 La Democracia, Miranda State, a town in the Venezuelan state of Miranda